Stop! is the debut studio album by English singer-songwriter Sam Brown, released on 8 June 1988 by A&M Records. It includes Brown's biggest and best-known single, the title track "Stop!".

Background
Produced by Sam Brown, her brother Pete Brown, Pete Smith, Danny Schogger, and John Madden, the album was recorded at the Power Plant in London, with then-Pink Floyd member David Gilmour's guitar parts on "This Feeling" and "I'll Be in Love" being recorded at Greene Street Studios in New York City. The track "Merry Go Round" has lyrics slightly adapted from W. H. Davies poem "Leisure". The CD edition of the album includes cover versions of Marvin Gaye's "Can I Get a Witness" and Ike & Tina Turner's "Nutbush City Limits".

Release and reception
On release, the album was received favourably by the majority of music critics. Brown's most commercially successful album, it went on to peak at number four on the UK Albums Chart and reached number 13 on the Australian ARIA Charts. The album also reached the top 10 in countries such as Austria, the Netherlands, and New Zealand. The album spawned three charting singles in the United Kingdom. "Stop!" peaked at number four on the UK Singles Chart; "This Feeling" peaked at number 91; "Can I Get a Witness" at number 15. The album has sold over two and a half million copies worldwide. The album has been certified gold by the British Phonographic Industry (BPI) and platinum by Music Canada.

Track listing

Personnel
Credits are adapted from the album's liner notes.

"Walking Back to Me"
Sam Brown – lead vocals; piano 
Pete Brown – lesley guitar; backing vocals
Paul Bangash – guitar
Richard Newman – drums
Jim Leverton – bass guitar
Danny Schogger – keyboards
Phil Saatchi – backing vocals
"Your Love Is All"
Sam Brown – lead vocals
Jakko Jakszyk – guitar; backing vocals
Gavin Harrison – drums; percussion
Ed Poole – bass guitar
Pandit Dinesh – Indian percussion
Andy Price – 1st violin
Mark Watson – 2nd violin
Kate Musker – viola
Peter Esswood – cello
Vicki Brown – backing vocals
Pete Brown – backing vocals
Kevin Malpass – string arrangements
"Stop!"
Sam Brown – lead vocals; string arrangements
Jakko Jakszyk – guitar
Gavin Harrison – drums
Ed Poole – bass guitar
Kevin Malpass – Hammond organ; string arrangements
Bob Andrews – Hammond organ solo
Andy Price – 1st violin
Mark Walton – 2nd violin
Kate Musker – viola
Peter Esswood – cello
Vicki Brown – backing vocals
Margo Buchanan – backing vocals
"It Makes Me Wonder"
Sam Brown – lead vocals
Phil Palmer – guitars
Roland Kerridge – drums
Ian Maidman – bass guitar
Paul Fishman – keyboards
Danny Cummings – percussion
Vicki Brown – backing vocals
Margo Buchanan – backing vocals
Phil Saatchi – backing vocals
Helen Chappelle – backing vocals
Pete Smith – backing vocals
"This Feeling"
Sam Brown – lead vocals
David Gilmour – guitar
Richard Newman – drums
Jim Leverton – bass guitar
Danny Schogger – piano; keyboards; piano accordion
Pete Brown – acoustic guitars
Vicki Brown – backing vocals
"Tea"
Sam Brown – lead vocals
Danny Schogger – all keyboards
"Piece of My Luck"
Sam Brown – lead vocals
Jakko Jakszyk – acoustic guitar
Gavin Harrison – drums
Danny Thompson – double bass
Bobby Valentino – violin
Julian Stringle – clarinet
Alan Wickham – trumpet
Rex O'Dell – trombone
Pete Brown – backing vocals
Richard Newman – backing vocals
"Ball and Chain"
Sam Brown – lead vocals
Jakko Jakszyk – guitar
Gavin Harrison – drums
Ed Poole – bass guitar
Bob Andrews – Hammond organ
Danny Schogger – keyboards
Vicki Brown – backing vocals

"Wrap Me Up"
Sam Brown – lead vocals
Jakko Jakszyk – guitars
Paul Bangash – guitar solo
Charlie Morgan – drum programming
Richard Newman – hooligan drums
Danny Schogger – keyboards
Pete Brown – backing vocals
"I'll Be In Love"
Sam Brown – lead vocals
David Gilmour – guitar
Danny Schogger – all keyboards; programming; arrangements
"Merry Go Round"
Sam Brown – lead vocals; all other keyboards
Danny Schogger – keyboard effects
Paul Bangash – guitar
Pete Brown – programming
Jim Abbiss – programming; Russian strings
"Sometimes You Just Don't Know"
Sam Brown – lead vocals; piano
Jakko Jakszyk – guitar; backing vocals
Pete Brown – guitar; backing vocals
Danny Schogger – keyboards
Gavin Harrison – drums
Ed Poole – bass guitar
Paul Bangash – backing vocals
"Can I Get a Witness"
Sam Brown – lead vocals
Joe Brown – lead guitar
Phil Palmer – rhythm guitar
Roland Kerridge – drums
Ian Maidman – bass guitar
Kenny Craddock – Hammond organ
Danny Cummings – percussion
Stuart Brooks – trumpet
John Huckridge – trumpet
Dave Hancock – trumpet 
Chris Pyne – trombone 
Pete Smith – trombone
Chris Dean – trombone
Stan Sulzmann – saxophone
Jamie Talbot – saxophone 
Jeff Daly – saxophone
Vicki Brown – backing vocals
Margo Buchanan – backing vocals
Phil Saatchi – backing vocals
Helen Chappelle – backing vocals
Pete Smith – backing vocals
Billy Vanderpuye – backing vocals
"High as a Kite"
Sam Brown – lead vocals
Jakko Jakszyk – guitars
Gavin Harrison – drums; marimba
Ed Poole – bass guitar
Danny Schogger – piano; keyboards
Andy Price – 1st violin
Mark Walton – 2nd violin
Kate Musker – viola
Peter Esswood – cello
Vicki Brown – backing vocals
Margo Buchanan – backing vocals
Kevin Malpass – string arrangements
"Nutbush City Limits"
Sam Brown – lead vocals
Joe Brown – rhythm guitar
Paul Bangash – wah-wah guitar
Richard Newman – drums
Jim Leverton – bass guitar
Danny Schogger – keyboards
Steve Sidwell – trumpet
Simon Gardner – trumpet
Pete Beachill – trombone
Jamie Talbot – tenor saxophone 
Dave Bishop – baritone saxophone
Martin Ditcham – percussion
Vicki Brown – backing vocals
Andy Caine – backing vocals
Kevin Malpass – brass arrangement

Charts

Weekly charts

Year-end charts

Certifications

Release history

References

External links
 

1988 debut albums
A&M Records albums
Sam Brown (singer) albums